Arrow Rock may refer to:

 Arrow Rock (New Zealand), an island in Tasman Bay
 Arrow Rock, Missouri, U.S., a village
 Arrow Rock Historic District, a National Historic Landmark district in Arrow Rock, Missouri
 Arrow Rock State Park, In Lamine Township, Cooper County, Missouri, U.S.
 Arrow Rock Festival, an annual music festival in the Netherlands